Kannia was an ancient Minoan city close to Gortyn in south-central Crete.

See also 
 List of ancient Greek cities

References

Cities in ancient Greece
Former populated places in Greece